The Coordinating Ministry for Political, Legal, and Security Affairs (abbreviated Kemenko Polhukam) is the Indonesian government ministry in charge of the planning and policy co-ordination, as well as synchronisation of policies in the affairs of politics, law, and national security. This Ministry is led by a "Coordinating Minister for Political, Legal and Security Affairs" (locally abbreviated as Menko Polhukam). Throughout its history, the post is usually occupied by retired Armed forces high-ranking officers, but under Joko Widodo's cabinet, it is currently held by politician of civilian background; Mahfud MD.

Coordinating Agencies
Based from Presidential Decree No. 73/2020, these ministry and agencies are placed under the coordinating ministry. The decree, however, removed State Intelligence Agency and National Cyber and Crypto Agency from the coordination of coordinating ministry as both intelligence agencies already placed directly under the President under the new decree and products of both intelligence agencies are solely reserved for president eyes only.
 Ministry of Home Affairs
 Ministry of Foreign Affairs
 Ministry of Defence
 Ministry of Law and Human Rights
 Ministry of Communication and Informatics
 Ministry of Administrative and Bureaucratic Reform
 Attorney General
 National Armed Forces (TNI)
 National Police (POLRI)
 Maritime Security Board

Organization Structure 
Based from the President Decree No. 73/2020 and as expanded with Coordinating Ministry for Political, Legal, and Security Affairs Decree No. 1/2021, the coordinating ministry consisted of:

 Office of the Coordinating Minister for Political, Legal, and Security Affairs
 Secretary of Coordinating Ministry for Political, Legal, and Security Affairs
 Bureau of Planning and Organization
 Bureau of Law, Conference, and Public Relation
 Division of Conference
 Sub-division of Conference Management
 Sub-division of Conference Drafting
 Sub-division of Conference Recording
 Division of Public Relation and Media Affairs
 Sub-division of Public Relation
 Bureau of General Affairs
 Sub-division of Administration and Protocol
 Sub-division of Protocol and Security
 Sub-division of Coordinating Minister Administration
 Sub-division of Coordinating Minister Secretary Administration
 Sub-division of Procurement and Household Affairs
 Sub-division of Household Affairs
 Sub-division of State Property Management
 Deputy I (Internal Political Coordination)
 Office of Deputy I
 Secretary of Deputy I
 Division of Planning and Evaluation
 Division of Administration
 Assistant Deputy-ship for Coordination for Democratic Process and Mass Organization
 Division of Democracy Strengthening and Democracy Institutionalization
 Division of Mass Organization Monitoring
 Assistant Deputy-ship for Coordination for Decentralization and Regional Autonomy
 Division of Decentralization
 Division of Regional Autonomy
 Assistant Deputy-ship for Coordination for Election Management and Political Parties Strengthening
 Division of Election Management and Local Leader Election
 Division of Political Parties Strengthening
 Assistant Deputy-ship for Coordination for Special Autonomy
 Division of Special Autonomy of Aceh, Jakarta, and Yogyakarta
 Division of Special Autonomy of Papua and West Papua
 Deputy II (External/Foreign Political Coordination)
 Office of Deputy II
 Secretary of Deputy II
 Division of Administration
 Sub-division of Administrative Supports
 Assistant Deputy-ship for Coordination for Asia, Pacific, and Africa Cooperation
 Division of Asia and Pacific Bilateral Cooperation
 Assistant Deputy-ship for Coordination for America and Europe Cooperation
 Division of America Bilateral Cooperation
 Assistant Deputy-ship for Coordination for ASEAN Cooperation
 Division of ASEAN Political and Defense Cooperation
 Division of ASEAN Law, Security, and Human Rights Cooperation
 Assistant Deputy-ship for Coordination for Multilateral Cooperation
 Division of International Political, Security, and Defense Cooperation
 Division of International Law, Human Rights, and Humanities Cooperation
 Deputy III (Law and Human Rights Coordination)
 Office of Deputy III
 Secretary of Deputy III
 Division of Administration
 Sub-division of Administrative Supports
 Assistant Deputy-ship for Coordination of Law Materials
 Assistant Deputy-ship for Coordination of Law Enforcement
 Division of Law Apparatuses Empowerment
 Assistant Deputy-ship for International Law Coordination
 Division of International Public Laws
 Division of International Private Laws
 Assistant Deputy-ship for Coordination of Human Rights Advancement and Protection
 Deputy IV (State Defense Coordination)
 Office of Deputy IV
 Secretary of Deputy IV
 Division of Administration
 Sub-division of Administrative Supports
 Assistant Deputy-ship for Coordination of Defense Doctrines and Strategies
 Division of Defense Doctrines
 Division of Defense Strategies
 Assistant Deputy-ship for Coordination of Defense Intelligence
 Division of Counter-Intelligence
 Division of State Threats
 Assistant Deputy-ship for Coordination of Border Areas and Spatial Defense
 Division of Border Areas
 Division of Spatial Defense
 Assistant Deputy-ship for Coordination of Forces, Capabilities and Defense Cooperation
 Division of Forces and Defense Capabilities
 Division of Defense Cooperation
 Deputy V (Security and Public Order Coordination)
 Office of Deputy V
 Secretary of Deputy V
 Division of Planning and Evaluation
 Sub-division of Planning
 Sub-division of Monitoring and Evaluation
 Division of Administration
 Sub-division of Administrative Supports
 Sub-division of Reporting
 Assistant Deputy-ship for Coordination of Security Intelligence, Public Guidance, and National Vital Objects
 Division of Security Intelligence
 Assistant Deputy-ship for Coordination of Handling of Conventional Crimes and Crimes against State Wealth and Properties
 Division of Handling of Conventional Crimes
 Division of Handling of Crimes against State Wealth and Properties
 Assistant Deputy-ship for Coordination of Handling of Transnational Crimes and Extraordinary Crimes
 Division of Handling of Transnational Crimes
 Assistant Deputy-ship for Coordination of Handling of Conflicts and Transportation Safety
 Division of Conflicts Handling and Conflict Contingency
 Division of Handling of Transportation Safety
 Deputy VI (National Integrity Coordination)
 Office of Deputy VI
 Secretary of Deputy VI
 Division of Planning and Evaluation
 Sub-division of Planning
 Division of Administration
 Sub-division of Administrative Supports
 Assistant Deputy-ship for Coordination of National Insight
 Assistant Deputy-ship for Coordination of Diversity Strengthening
 Assistant Deputy-ship for Coordination of National Alertness
 Division of Public Awareness Improvement
 Assistant Deputy-ship for Coordination of National Defense Awareness
 Division of National Defense Awareness in Public
 Division of National Defense Awareness in Educational Institutions and Workplaces
 Assistant Deputy-ship for Coordination of Handling of Transnational Crimes and Extraordinary Crimes
 Division of Handling of Transnational Crimes
 Assistant Deputy-ship for Coordination of Handling of Conflicts and Transportation Safety
 Division of Conflicts Handling and Conflict Contingency
 Division of Handling of Transportation Safety
 Deputy VII (Communication, Information, and Apparatuses Coordination)
 Office of Deputy VII
 Secretary of Deputy VII
 Division of Planning and Evaluation
 Sub-division of Monitoring and Evaluation
 Division of Administration
 Sub-division of Administrative Supports
 Assistant Deputy-ship for Coordination of Public Information and Mass Media
 Division of Mass Media and Social Media
 Assistant Deputy-ship for Coordination of Telecommunication and Informatics
 Division of Telecommunication
 Division of Informatics and Cybersecurity
 Assistant Deputy-ship for Coordination of Government Administration
 Assistant Deputy-ship for Coordination of Public Service Enhancement
 Division of Improvement of Goods and Services
 Inspectorate
 Office of Inspector General
 Expert Staffs
 Expert Staffs of Ideology and Constitution
 Expert Staffs of National Resilience
 Expert Staffs of Territorial Sovereignty and Maritime Affairs
 Expert Staffs of Human Resources and Technology
 Expert Staffs of Natural Resources and Environment
Aside of this structure, the coordinating ministry also housed several special desks. Currently, only two special desks housed in the coordinating ministry, as the third desk, Cyber Information Defense and Security Desk already merged into National Cyber and Crypto Agency. The special desks are:

 National Insights Strengthening Desk (under Deputy VI)
 Papua Special Autonomy Desk (under Deputy I, currently dormant since 2021)

List of ministers
Here is the list of Coordinating Minister for Political, Legal, and Security Affairs since its inception.

References

Government of Indonesia